Associazione Calcio Cuneo 1905 is a defunct Italian football club, based in Cuneo, Piedmont. At the end of the 2018–19 season it was relegated from Serie C and did not register for Serie D for 2019–20.

History
The club was founded in 1905 as Unione Sportiva Alta Italia, taking its current name in 1998.
It has played in Serie C from 1938 to 1943 and from 1946 to 1948. It has played in Serie B in the season 1945-46 as Cuneo Sportiva. It has played in Serie C2 from 1989 to 1992 as Cuneo Sportiva, from 2005 to 2008 and in Lega Pro Seconda Divisione in the season 2011–12.

Scudetto Dilettanti 2010-11
Cuneo in the season 2010–11, from Serie D group A was promoted to Lega Pro Seconda Divisione,  conquering also the Scudetto Dilettanti.

Lega Pro (2011–14)
In the season 2011-12 of Lega Pro Seconda Divisione the club was promoted to Lega Pro Prima Divisione after 64 years, beating Virtus Entella 5–2 in the final return of the play-off after the 1-1 of the first round. The club relegated back to Seconda Divisione in 2013 and Serie D in 2014.

Honours
Serie D:
 Winners (3): 2010–11, 2014–15, 2016–17
Scudetto Dilettanti:
 Winners (1): 2010–11

References

 
Football clubs in Piedmont and Aosta Valley
Association football clubs established in 1905
Serie B clubs
Serie C clubs
Sport in Cuneo
1905 establishments in Italy
2019 disestablishments in Italy